El Bosque Urban Park is a protected wetland and forest in the city of Valdivia, south-central Chile. The park is owned by the real estate company SOCOVESA that developed the adjacent neighborhood of El Bosque. The park originated in 1997 as a private park open only to residents of the neighborhood. It was opened to the public in 2004, the same year administration was transferred to the ad-hoc organisation Comité Ecológico Lemu Lahuen.

See also 
Área Costera Protegida Punta Curiñanco
Oncol Park
Punucapa
Urban Wetlands Law

References

El Bosque
Forests of Chile
El Bosque
Valdivia